Various research and polling firms conducted opinion polling before the 2022 federal election in individual electorates across Australia, in relation to voting intentions in the Australian House of Representatives.

Australian Capital Territory

New South Wales

Northern Territory

Queensland

South Australia

Tasmania

Victoria

Western Australia

Notes

See also 

 Opinion polling for the 2022 Australian federal election

References 

2022
2022 Australian federal election